Carlos Palenque (28 June 1944, La Paz – 8 March 1997) was a Bolivian musician, singer and politician known to his fans as the Compadre. He died of a heart attack.

References 

1944 births
1997 deaths
People from La Paz
20th-century Bolivian male singers
Conscience of Fatherland politicians
Candidates for President of Bolivia